"Twilight Time" is a popular song with lyrics by Buck Ram and music by the Three Suns (Morty Nevins, Al Nevins, and Artie Dunn).  Ram said that he originally wrote it as a poem, without music, while in college.

Original instrumental recordings of "Twilight Time" included those made respectively by the Three Suns (1944) and Les Brown & His Band of Renown (1945).

Les Brown's version of "Twilight Time" was recorded in November 1944 and released in early 1945 as the B-side of "Sentimental Journey," the first recording of that song. While the A-side featured Doris Day's vocals, "Twilight Time" was an instrumental.

The Platters recording
It has been recorded by numerous groups over the years. However, the best-known version of the song was recorded by the Platters and became a number one hit on both the pop singles and R&B best sellers charts in 1958 in the United States. The song also reached number three in the United Kingdom. In 1963, the Platters recorded a Spanish version of the song entitled "La Hora del Crepúsculo", sung in a rhumba-style tempo. 
The Platters version of the song was featured in the official trailer for the Disney+ show WandaVision.

Other notable versions
 Andy Williams reached #86 on the Billboard Hot 100 in 1962
 Willie Nelson, on his album What a Wonderful World (1988). Nelson's version peaked at number 41 on the Billboard Hot Country Singles chart in 1989.

References

1944 songs
1962 singles
1958 singles
Songs written by Buck Ram
The Platters songs
Andy Williams songs
Bobby Vinton songs
Willie Nelson songs
Number-one singles in Australia
Billboard Top 100 number-one singles
Cashbox number-one singles
Mercury Records singles